Mikhail Kukushkin was the defending champion, but decided not to participate.

3rd seed Lukáš Rosol defeated qualifier Evgeny Donskoy 7–5, 7–6(7–2) in the final.

Seeds

Draw

Finals

Top half

Bottom half

References
 Main Draw
 Qualifying Draw

Sparkassen Open - Singles
Sport in Lower Saxony
2011 Singles